Tales From Planet Earth is a collection of science fiction short stories by British writer Arthur C. Clarke, originally published in 1989.

Contents
Contents of Tales From Planet Earth include:

 Preface, by Arthur C. Clarke and Isaac Asimov
 "The Road to the Sea"
 "Hate"
 "Publicity Campaign"
 "The Other Tiger"
 "The Deep Range"
 "If I Forget Thee, Oh Earth..."
 "The Cruel Sky"
 "The Parasite"
 "The Next Tenants"
 "Saturn Rising"
 "The Man Who Ploughed the Sea"
 "The Wall of Darkness"
 "The Lion of Comarre"
 "On Golden Seas"

References

External links 
 

1989 short story collections
Short story collections by Arthur C. Clarke
Hutchinson (publisher) books